Tineoidea is the ditrysian superfamily of moths that includes clothes moths, bagworms and relatives. There are six families usually included within it, Eriocottidae, Arrhenophanidae, Lypusidae, Acrolophidae, Tineidae and Psychidae, whose relationships are currently uncertain.

The Lypusidae, for example, might belong to the Gelechioidea.

Some authors merge the Tineoidea and all or part of the Gracillarioidea; in this case the Tineoidea sensu stricto are downranked to a series Tineiformes.

References

Firefly Encyclopedia of Insects and Spiders, edited by Christopher O'Toole, 2002

External links
Global Taxonomic Database of Tineidae

 
Lepidoptera superfamilies